Qezeljeh (also known as Ghezeljeh Hajebloo, Qīzīljāh, and Qīzīljeh) is a village in Hajjilu Rural District, in the Central District of Kabudarahang County, Hamadan Province, Iran. At the 2006 census, its population was 946, in 215 families.

References 

Populated places in Kabudarahang County